Burnin' is the sixth album by Jamaican reggae group the Wailers (also known as Bob Marley and the Wailers), released in October 1973. It was written by all three members and recorded and produced by the Wailers in Jamaica, contemporaneously with tracks from the Catch a Fire album with further recording, mixing and completion while on the Catch a Fire tour in London. It contains the song "I Shot the Sheriff". It was the last album before Marley, Peter Tosh and Bunny Wailer decided to pursue solo careers, while continuing their local releases through their company Tuff Gong Records. A commercial and critical success in the United States, Burnin was certified Gold and later added to the National Recording Registry, with the Library of Congress deeming it historically and culturally significant.

Recording
The album was recorded at Harry J's studio in Kingston, Jamaica, with the Wailers producing. It was mixed and overdubbed by Chris Blackwell at Island Records' Basing Street studios in London during the spring of 1973 while the band were touring in support of their previous album, Catch a Fire.

Music and lyrics
Burnin opens with one of The Wailers best known songs, the call to action "Get Up, Stand Up" and includes a more confrontational and militant tone than previous records, such as in another Wailers standard turned into a number one hit by Eric Clapton, "I Shot the Sheriff". The songs "Duppy Conqueror", "Small Axe", and "Put It On" are re-recordings of songs previously released on their co productions with Lee Perry’s Upsetters Label.

Critical reception

Reviewing in Christgau's Record Guide: Rock Albums of the Seventies (1981), Robert Christgau wrote: "This is as perplexing as it is jubilant—sometimes gripping, sometimes slippery. It's reggae, obviously, but it's not mainstream reggae, certainly not rock or soul, maybe some kind of futuristic slow funk, War without the pseudo-jazz. What's inescapable is The Wailers’ ferocious gift for melodic propaganda. It's one thing to come up with four consecutive title hooks, another to make the titles 'Get Up Stand Up,' 'Hallelujah Time,' 'I Shot the Sheriff,' 'Burnin' and Lootin'.'"

In 2003, the album was ranked number 319 on Rolling Stone magazine's list of the 500 greatest albums of all time. The album maintained the same position in a 2012 update of the list.

In 2007 the album was added to the Library of Congress' National Recording Registry for its historical and cultural significance.

Track listing

 Sides one and two were combined as tracks 1–10 on CD reissues.

The Definitive Remastered'' edition (2001)

Text from 12 June 2001 Tuff Gong cat# 314 548 894-2 CD liner notes:
bonus tracks 11-13 recorded during Burnin' sessions at Harry J. Studios, Kingston
track 11: originally issued 29 May 1973 b-side of "Concrete Jungle"; Island WIP cat# 6164
tracks 12 and 13: previously unreleased

Deluxe edition (2004)
{{Track listing
| headline       = Disc one: Burnin remastered (bonus tracks)
| extra_column   = Writer(s)
| total_length   =

| title14        = Get Up, Stand Up
| note14         = unreleased alternate take
| extra14        = Marley, Tosh
| length14       = 3:42

| title15        = Get Up, Stand Up
| note15         = unreleased single version
| extra15        = Marley, Tosh
| length15       = 3:11
}}

PersonnelMusicians Peter Tosh – guitar, vocals, keyboards
 Bob Marley – guitar, vocals
 Bunny Wailer – percussion, vocals
 Aston "Family Man" Barrett – bass guitar
 Carlton "Carlie" Barrett – drums
 Earl Lindo – keyboards, vocalsProduction The Wailers and Chris Blackwell – producer
 Tony Platt – engineer
 Phill Brown – engineerArtwork'''
 CCS London
 Bob Bowkett
 Simon Perfitt
 Ester Anderson – photography

Charts

References

External links

Library of Congress essay on the album

1973 albums
Bob Marley and the Wailers albums
Albums produced by Chris Blackwell
Island Records albums
Tuff Gong albums
United States National Recording Registry albums